Dorota Kobiela (born 1978) is a Polish filmmaker, screenwriter, and producer. She is best known for co-directing her first fully painted animated feature film Loving Vincent (2017) with Hugh Welchman.

Career
Kobiela conceived Loving Vincent as a 7-minute short movie in 2008, Loving Vincent was idealized by Kobiela, a painter herself, after studying the techniques and the artist's story through his letters.

Filmography
 2022: The Peasants (upcoming)
 2017: Loving Vincent (directed, writer, editor, visual effects) 
 2011: Little Postman (Short, director, writer) 
 2011: Chopin's Drawings (Short, director, writer) 
 2011: The Flying Machine (Short, director, writer)

Awards and nominations

References

External links
 

1978 births
Living people
People from Bytom
Polish animators
Polish animated film directors
Polish animated film producers
Polish film directors
Polish screenwriters
Polish film producers
Polish women animators
Polish women film directors
Polish women film producers
Polish women screenwriters